The title Hero of the Soviet Union was the highest distinction of the Soviet Union. It was awarded 12,775 times. Due to the large size of the list, it has been broken up into multiple pages.

 Ivan Pavkin ru
 Iosif Pavlenko ru
 Nikolai Pavlenko ru
 Dmitry Pavlikov ru
 Aleksandr Pavlichenko ru
 Lyudmila Pavlichenko
 Aleksandr Georgievich Pavlov ru
 Aleksandr Ivanovich Pavlov ru
 Aleksey Dmitrievich Pavlov ru
 Aleksey Nikolaevich Pavlov ru
 Anatoly Pavlov ru
 Anton Pavlov ru
 Boris Pavlov ru
 Valentin Pavlov ru
 Vasily Aleksandrovich Pavlov ru
 Vasily Vasilyevich Pavlov ru
 Vasily Georgievich Pavlov ru
 Vasily Mikhailovich Pavlov ru
 Vasily Fyodorovich Pavlov ru
 Vitaly Pavlov ru
 Vladimir Vladimirovich Pavlov ru
 Vladimir Grigorievich Pavlov ru
 Vladimir Fyodorovich Pavlov ru
 Georgy Vasilyevich Pavlov ru
 Georgy Petrovich Pavlov ru
 Grigory Pavlov ru
 Dmitry Grigorevich Pavlov
 Dmitry Ivanovich Pavlov ru
 Yefim Pavlov ru
 Ivan Dmitrievich Pavlov ru
 Ivan Mikhailovich Pavlov ru
 Ivan Fomich Pavlov (twice)
 Konstantin Pavlov ru
 Lavr Pavlov ru
 Mikhail Nikitovich Pavlov (colonel) ru
 Mikhail Nikitovich Pavlov (aviator) ru
 Nikifor Mikhailovich Pavlov ru
 Nikifor Savelevich Pavlov ru
 Nikolai Dmitrievich Pavlov ru
 Nikolai Nikitovich Pavlov ru
 Nikolai Pavlovich Pavlov ru
 Nikolai Spiridonovich Pavlov ru
 Pavel Ivanovich Pavlov ru
 Pavel Ilyich Pavlov ru
 Pavel Prokopevich Pavlov ru
 Pyotr Yegorovich Pavlov ru
 Pyotr Pavlovich Pavlov ru
 Pyotr Trofimovich Pavlov ru
 Sergey Pavlov ru
 Timofey Pavlov ru
 Fyodor Pavlov ru
 Yuri Pavlov ru
 Yakov Pavlov
 Ivan Pavlovich ru
 Aleksey Pavlovsky ru
 Anatoly Pavlovsky ru
 Ivan Pavlovsky
 Ilya Pavlovsky ru
 Rafail Pavlovsky ru
 Fyodor Illarionovich Pavlovsky ru
 Fyodor Kirillovich Pavlovsky ru
 Mikhail Pavlotsky ru
 Nikolai Pavlushkin ru
 Arkady Pavlushko ru
 Valentin Pavlyuk ru
 Konstantin Pavlyukov ru
 Ivan Pavlyuchenko ru
 Ignat Pavlyuchenkov ru
 Boris Padalko ru
 Yakov Paderin ru
 Yuri Padorin ru
 Leonid Padukov ru
 Yevsigny Paygusov ru
 Aleksandr Paykov ru
 Sergey Pavalin ru
 Vladimir Palagin ru
 Georgy Palamarchuk ru
 Aleksandr Palansky ru
 Anton Paliev ru
 Fyodor Paly ru
 Ivan Palilov ru
 Sergey Palchikov ru
 Anton Panarin ru
 Mikhail Panarin ru
 Vladimir Panasyuk ru
 Igor Panganis ru
 Pyotr Panezhda ru
 Aleksey Panzhensky ru
 Mikhail Panikakha
 Boris Panin ru
 Ivan Panin ru
 Pavel Panin ru
 Andrey Panikhidnikov ru
 Mikhail Panichkin ru
 Nikolai Panichkin ru
 Aleksey Pankov ru
 Boris Pankov ru
 Vasily Pankov ru
 Ilya Pankov ru
 Mikhail Pankov ru
 Aleksandr Pankratov ru
 Vasily Pankratov ru
 Georgy Pankratov ru
 Sergey Pankratov ru
 Aleksandr Panov ru
 Aleksey Panov ru
 Anatoly Panov ru
 Vasily Panov ru
 Dmitry Panov ru
 Mikhail Panov
 Nikolai Panov ru
 Pavel Panov ru
 Pyotr Panov ru
 Stepan Panov ru
 Gavriil Panteleev ru
 Lev Panteleev ru
 Anatoly Pantelkin ru
 Aleksey Georgievich Panfilov ru
 Aleksey Pavlovich Panfilov ru
 Vasily Panfilov ru
 Dmitry Panfilov ru
 Ivan Panfilov
 Mikhail Panfilov ru
 Nikandr Panfilov ru
 Aleksey Panchenko ru
 Boris Panchenko ru
 Grigory Panchenko ru
 Dmitry Panchenko ru
 Ivan Panchenko ru
 Konstantin Panchenko ru
 Mikhail Panchenko ru
 Trofim Pancheshny ru
 Vasily Panchikov ru
 Ivan Pankov ru
 Ivan Papanin (twice)
 Arnold Papel ru
 Lazar Papernik ru
 Nikolai Papivin ru
 Vladimir Papidze ru
 Pavel Papin
 Georgy Papuashvili ru
 Semyon Papulov ru
 Ivan Papyshev ru
 Aleksandr Paradovich ru
 Ivan Paramonov ru
 Konstantin Paramonov ru
 Pavel Paramonov ru
 Yefim Parakhin ru
 Vladimir Parakhnevich ru
 Feodosy Parashchenko ru
 Dmitry Parovatkin ru
 Mikhail Parsegov
 Afanasy Parfyonov ru
 Viktor Parfyonov ru
 Zoya Parfyonova
 Pavel Parfilov ru
 Nikifor Parkhomenko ru
 Nikolai Parkhomenko ru
 Yefim Parkhomchuk ru
 Viktor Parshin ru
 Georgy Parshin (twice)
 Ivan Parshin ru
 Mikhail Parshin ru
 Nikolai Parshin ru
 Fyodor Parshin ru
 Yuri Parshin ru
 Timofey Parshutkin ru
 Ivan Parygin ru
 Artyom Pasechnik ru
 Nikolai Pasov ru
 Aleksandr Passar ru
 Yuri Pastorov ru
 Gennady Pastukhov ru
 Dmitry Pastukhov ru
 Pyotr Pastyryov ru
 Grigory Pasynkov ru
 Ivan Pasynok ru
 Aleksey Pasko 
 Yevdokiya Pasko
 Nikolai Pasko 
 Aleksandr Patrakov ru
 Aleksey Patrin ru
 Ivan Patrushev ru
 Fyodor Pakhalchuk ru
 Nikolai Pakhanov ru
 Ivan Pakholyuk ru
 Aleksey Pakhomov ru
 Grigory Pakhomov ru
 Dmitry Pakhomov ru
 Pyotr Pakhomov ru
 Nikolai Pakhotishchev ru
 Viktor Patsayev
 Valentin Patsyuchenko ru
 Pyotr Pashin ru
 Valentin Pashirov ru
 Aleksey Pashkevich ru
 Stepan Pashkevich ru
 Aleksandr Pashkov ru
 Aleksey Pashkov ru
 Andrey Pashkov ru
 Ivan Pashkov ru
 Anisim Pashchenko ru
 Ivan Pashchenko ru
 Grigory Pevnev ru
 Viktor Pevunov ru
 Grigory Pegov ru
 Vasily Pedko ru
 Naum Peysakhovsky ru
 Aleksandr Pelevin ru
 Vladimir Pelipenko ru
 Zinovy Penaki ru
 Ivan Penkov ru
 Mikhail Penkov ru
 Ivan Penya ru
 Dmitry Penyazkov ru
 Yevgeny Pepelyaev
 Nikolai Pepelyaev ru
 Aleksey Pervukhin ru
 Aleksandr Pervushin ru
 Semyon Perevyortkin ru
 Yefrem Perevertnyuk ru
 Andrey Perevoznikov ru
 Mikhail Perevozny ru
 Nikolai Perevozchenko ru
 Pyotr Pereguda ru
 Aleksandr Peregudov ru
 Aleksey Peregudov ru
 Iosif Peredery ru
 Stepan Perekalsky ru
 Grigory Perekrestov ru
 Aleksey Perelet
 Aleksandr Perepelitsa ru
 Polikarp Perepelitsa ru
 Mikhail Perepechin ru
 Pyotr Perepechin ru
 Pyotr Peresumkin ru
 Fyodor Peresypkin ru
 Vasily Peretrukhin ru
 Ivan Perekhoda ru
 Alif Piriyev
 Yerofey Perminov ru
 Ivan Perminov ru
 Veniamin Permyakov ru
 Vladimir Permyakov ru
 Dmitry Perov ru
 Ivan Perov
 Anatoly Perfilev ru
 Nikolai Perfilev ru
 Franz Perkhorovich
 Fyodor Pershikov ru
 Boris Pershin ru
 Konstantin Pershin ru
 Ivan Pershuov ru
 Dmitry IvanovichPeskov ru
 Dmitry Mikhailovich Peskov ru
 Ivan Peskov ru
 Konstantin Peskov ru
 Pavel Peskov ru
 Aleksey Pesterev ru
 Georgy Pesterev ru
 Boris Pestrov ru
 Vasily Pestryakov ru
 Aleksandr Petelin ru
 Yuri Petelin ru
 Georgy Peters ru
 Pavel Petikin ru
 Maksim Petin ru
 Iosif Petlyuk ru
 Ivan Ilyich Petrakov ru
 Ivan Fyodorovich Petrakov ru
 Anatoly Petrakovsky
 Pavel Petrakov ru
 Ivan Petrashev ru
 Valentin Petrashov ru
 Vasily Vasilyevich Petrenko ru
 Vasily Gavrilovich Petrenko ru
 Vasily Yakovlevich Petrenko ru
 Gennady Petrenko ru
 Grigory Petrenko ru
 Dmitry Petrenko ru
 Yevgeny Petrenko ru
 Ivan Petrenko ru
 Nikolai Petrenko ru
 Stepan Petrenko ru
 Afanasy Petrik ru
 Andrey Petrikov ru
 Andrey Petrichenko ru
 Ivan Petrichenko ru
 Vasily Petrishchev ru
 Sergey Petrishchev ru
 Aleksandr Ivanovich Petrov ru
 Aleksandr Pavlovich Petrov ru
 Aleksandr Fyodorovich Petrov (corporal) ru
 Aleksandr Fyodorovich Petrov (lieutenant) ru
 Aleksey Vasilyevich Petrov ru
 Aleksey Ivanovich Petrov (colonel) ru
 Aleksey Ivanovich Petrov (soldier) ru
 Anton Vasilyevich Petrov ru
 Anton Ilyich Petrov ru
 Anton Petrovich Petrov ru
 Vadim Petrov ru
 Vasily Vasilyevich Petrov ru
 Vasily Vasilyevich Petrov ru
 Vasily Ivanovich Petrov
 Vasily Stepanovich Petrov (twice)
 Vasily Yakovlevich Petrov ru
 Viktor Petrov ru
 Vladimir Aleksandrovich Petrov ru
 Vladimir Yakovlevich Petrov ru
 Vyacheslav Petrov ru
 Georgy Georgievoch Petrov ru
 Georgy Ivanovich Petrov ru
 Grigory Petrovich Petrov ru
 Dmitry Petrov ru
 Yevgeny Petrov ru
 Ivan Vasilyevich Petrov ru
 Ivan Yefimovich Petrov
 Ivan Ivanovich Petrov ru
 Ivan Petrovich Petrov ru
 Ivan Timofeevich Petrov ru
 Igor Petrov ru
 Mikhail Zakharovich Petrov ru
 Mikhail Ivanovich Petrov ru
 Mikhail Illarionovich Petrov ru
 Mikhail Petrovich Petrov (general)
 Mikhail Petrovich Petrov (colonel)
 Mikhail Timofeevich Petrov ru
 Nikolai Andreevich Petrov ru
 Nikolai Ivanovich Petrov ru
 Nikolai Semyonovich Petrov ru
 Nikolai Stepanovich Petrov ru
 Pavel Gavrilovich Petrov ru
 Pyotr Mikhailovich Petrov
 Roman Petrov ru
 Semyon Petrov ru
 Antonina Petrova
 Galina Petrova
 Georgy Petrovsky ru
 Konstantin Maksimovich Petrovsky ru
 Konstantin Ostapovich Petrovsky ru
 Aleksey Petropavlov ru
 Suren Petrosyan ru
 Vasily Petrochenko ru
 Yevdokim Petrunin ru
 Nikolai Petrukhin ru
 Vasily Petrushevich ru
 Aleksandr Petrushevsky ru
 Ivan Petrushin ru
 Vasily Petryuk ru
 Aleksandr Petryaev ru
 Aleksey Petukhov ru
 Ivan Petukhov ru
 Ignaty Petukhov ru
 Nikolai Dmitrievich Petukhov ru
 Nikolai Yevgenevich Petukhov ru
 Adam Petushkov ru
 Aleksey Petushkov ru
 Iosif Petchenko ru
 Sergey Petyalin ru
 Yefim Pechyonkin ru
 Nikolai Pechyony ru
 Vasily Pechenyuk ru
 Nikita Pechenyuk ru
 Fyodor Pechenyuk ru
 Aleksandr Pecheritsa ru
 Mikhail Pechersky ru
 Georgy Pechkovsky ru
 Aleksandr Peshakov ru
 Vasily Peshekhonov ru
 Aleksandr Ivanovich Peshkov ru
 Vladimir Peshkov ru
 Andrey Peshchenko ru
 Pyotr Piven ru
 Nikolai Pivnyuk ru
 Viktor Pivovar ru
 Mikhail Yevdokimovich Pivovarov ru
 Mikhail Ivanovich Pivovarov ru
 Sergey Pivovarov ru
 Vladimir Pivchenkov ru
 Nikolai Pigida ru
 Ivan Pigin ru
 Nikolai Pigorev ru
 Nikolai Pidzhakov ru
 Ivan Pidtykan ru
 Aleksandr Pikalov ru
 Vladimir Pikalov
 Konstantin Pikachyov ru
 Ivan Pikin ru
 Aleksandr Pikunov ru
 Valentin Pilipas ru
 Vladimir Pilipenko ru
 Ivan Pilipenko ru
 Mikhail Vasilyevich Pilipenko ru
 Mikhail Korneevich Pilipenko ru
 Yakov Pilipenko ru
 Dmitry Pilipchenko ru
 Aleksandr Pilnikov ru
 Pyotr Pilyutov ru
 Vasily Vasilyevich Pimenov ru
 Vasily Markelovich Pimenov ru
 Ivan Ivanovich Pimenov ru
 Ivan Timofeevich Pimenov ru
 Matvey Pinsky ru
 Andrey Pinchuk ru
 Grigory Pinchuk ru
 Nikolai Pinchuk
 Timofey Pinchuk ru
 Georgy Pinyaev ru
 Aleksey Pirmisashvili ru
 Vladimir Pirogov ru
 Ivan Pirogov ru
 Timofey Pirogov ru
 Aleksandr Pirogovsky ru
 Stepan Pirozhenko ru
 Boris Pirozhkov ru
 Andrey Piryazev ru
 Andrey Pisarev ru
 Gennady Pisarev ru
 Georgy Pisarev ru
 Nikolai Pisarevsky ru
 Andrey Pisarenko ru
 Nikolai Pisarenko ru
 Pavel Pisarenko ru
 Ivan Piskaryov ru
 Vasily Yemelyanovich Pisklov ru
 Vasily Kirillovich Pisklov ru
 Ivan Piskun ru
 Boris Piskunov ru
 Vasily Piskunov ru
 Mikhail Piskunov ru
 Viktor Pislegin ru
 Vladimir Pismenny ru
 Vyacheslav Pismenny ru
 Ivan Pismenny ru
 Georgy Pitersky ru
 Dmitry Pichugin ru
 Yevgeny Pichugin ru
 Ivan Pichugin ru
 Mikhail Pichugin ru
 Vasily Pichugov ru
 Ivan Pishkan ru
 Boris Pishchikevich ru
 Andrian Pishchulin ru
 Ivan Piyavchik ru
 Dmitry Plakidin ru
 Mikhail Plaksa ru
 Vladimir Platitsin ru
 Aleksey Platov ru
 Mikhail Platov ru
 Venedikt Platonov ru
 Georgy Platonov ru
 Konstantin Platonov ru
 Nikolai Yevgenevich Platonov ru
 Nikolai Yevtikhievich Platonov ru
 Nikolai Lavrentevich Platonov ru
 Aleksey Plakhotnik ru
 Daniil Plakhotnik ru
 Nikolai Plakhotny ru
 Savely Plakhotya ru
 Boris Plashkin ru
 Vasily Plesinov ru
 Pavel Pletenskoy ru
 Pyotr Pletnyov ru
 Andrey Plekhanov ru
 Ivan Plekhanov ru
 Nikolai Plekhanov ru
 Aleksandr Pleshakov ru
 Aleksey Pleshakov ru
 Ivan Pleshev ru
 Ivan Pleshivtsev ru
 Ivan Pleshkov ru
 Pyotr Pleshkov ru
 Issa Pliyev
 Ivan Plis ru
 Igor Ploskonos ru
 Mikhail Nikolayevich Plotkin ru
 Aleksandr Plotnikov ru
 Dmitry Plotnikov ru
 Pavel Artemyevich Plotnikov (twice)
 Pavel Mikhailovich Plotnikov ru
 Fyodor Plotnikov ru
 Pyotr Plotyansky ru
 Ivan Plokhikh ru
 Aleksey Plokhov ru
 Vasily Plokhoy ru
 Mikhail Plugaryov ru
 Aleksey Plugatar ru
 Timofey Pluzhnikov ru
 Artyom Plysenko ru
 Nikolai Plysyuk ru
 Nikolai Plyusnin ru
 Aleksandr Plyushch ru
 Sergey Plyushchenko ru
 Aleksandr Plyakin ru
 Ivan Plyakin ru
 Yakov Plyashechnik ru
 Aleksandr Poverenny ru
 Pyotr Povetkin ru
 Ivan Povoroznyuk ru
 Stepan Pogodaev ru
 Dmitry Pogodin
 Nikolai Pogodin ru
 Vasily Pogorelov ru
 Vasily Pogorelov ru
 Ivan Pogorelov ru
 Mikhail Pogorelov ru
 Semyon Pogorelov ru
 Aleksandr Pogoreltsev ru
 Aramais Pogosyan ru
 Daniil Pogpebnoy ru
 Pavel Poda ru
 Yegor Podanev ru
 Stepan Podgaynov ru
 Vladimir Podgorbunsky ru
 Leonid Podgorbunsky ru
 Timofey Podgorny ru
 Aleksandr Poddavashkin ru
 Aleksey Poddubny ru
 Nikolai Poddubny ru
 Vladimir Podzigun ru
 Viktor Podkolodnov ru
 Stepan Podkopaev ru
 Ivan Podkopay ru
 Sergey Podluzsky ru
 Stepan Podnavozny ru
 Valentin Podnevich ru
 Ivan Podoltsev ru
 Nikolai Podorozhny ru
 Nikolai Podsadnik ru
 Aleksandr Podchufarov ru
 Mikhail Podshibyakin ru
 Matevy Podymakhin ru
 Ivan Pozharsky
 Nikolai Pozharsky ru
 Pyotr Pozdeev ru
 Aleksey Pavlovich Pozdnyakov ru
 Aleksey Petrovich Pozdnyakov ru
 Konstantin Posdnyakov ru
 Sergey Pozdnyakov ru
 Fyodor Pozdnyakov ru
 Nikolai Pozevalkin ru
 Viktor Poznyak ru
 Aleksandr Poznyakov ru
 Timofey Pozolotin ru
 Mikhail Pokalo ru
 Ivan Pokalchuk ru
 Ivan Pokatilov ru
 Nikolai Pokachalov ru
 Vasily Pokidko ru
 Aleksandr Poklikushkin ru
 Vasily Pokolodny ru
 Dmitry Pokramovich ru
 Vladimir Pokrovsky ru
 Georgy Pokrovsky ru
 Nikolai Pokrovsky ru
 Pyotr Pokryshev (twice)
 Aleksandr Pokryshkin (thrice)
 Nikolai Polagushin ru
 Ivan Polbin (twice)
 Ivan Polevoy ru
 Pavel Polevoy ru
 Nikolai Polezhaev ru
 Semyon Polezhaev ru
 Sergey Poleshaykin ru
 Fyodor Poletaev ru
 Sergey Poletsky ru
 Nikolai Poleshchikov ru
 Vasily Poleshchuk ru
 Mariya Polivanova
 Gerasin Polikanov ru
 Ilya Polikakhin ru
 Aleksandr Polin ru
 Aleksey Polin ru
 Viktor Polinsky ru
 Semyon Politov ru
 Ivan Ivanovich Polishchuk ru
 Ivan Mikhailovich Polishchuk ru
 Iosif Polishchuk ru
 Spiridon Polishchuk ru
 Pavel Polkovnikov ru
 Ivan Polovets ru
 Aleksandr Polovinkin ru
 Valentin Polovinkin ru
 Vasily Polovinkin ru
 Polikarp Polovinko ru
 Gavriil Polovchenya ru
 Pavel Pologov ru
 Ivan Polozkov ru
 Konstantin Polozov ru
 Yuri Polony ru
 Yevgeny Polonsky ru
 Aleksey Polosin
 Yevgeny Poltavky ru
 Pavel Poluboyarov ru
 Nikolai Polukarov ru
 Aleksandr Polunin ru
 Ivan Polunin ru
 Valery Polunovsky ru
 Vladimir Polupanov ru
 Ivan Polukhin ru
 Pyotr Polushkin ru
 Georgy Poluektov ru
 Stepan Poluektov ru
 Grigory Poluyanov ru
 Vasily Polygalov ru
 Pavel Polygalov ru
 Fyodor Polynin
 Dmitry Polynkin ru
 Natan Polyusuk ru
 Valery Polyakov
 Vasily Vasilyevich Polyakov ru
 Vasily Georgievich Polyakov ru
 Vasily Trofimovich Polyakov ru
 Vitaly Polyakov ru
 Vladimir Polyakov ru
 Ivan Vasilyevich Polyakov ru
 Ivan Kuzmich Polyakov ru
 Ivan Matveevich Polyakov ru
 Konstantin Polyakov ru
 Leonid Polyakov ru
 Mikhail Polyakov ru
 Nikolai Polyakov ru
 Pavel Polyakov ru
 Sergey Polyakov ru
 Ivan Polyanichkin ru
 Aleksandr Polyansky ru
 Nikolai Polyansky ru
 Pyotr Polyansky ru
 Stepan Polyansky 
 Aleksandr Pomazunov ru
 Vasily Pomeshchik ru
 Dmitry Pomukchinsky ru
 Semyon Ponmarchuk ru
 Aleksey Ponomaryov ru
 Vasily Ponomaryov ru
 Viktor Ponomaryov ru
 Georgy Ponomaryov ru
 Dmitry Ponomaryov ru
 Ivan Ponomaryov ru
 Mikhail Petrovich Ponomaryov ru
 Mikhail Sergeevich Ponomaryov
 Nikolai Ponomaryov ru
 Pavel Yelizarovich Ponomaryov ru
 Pavel Ivanovich Ponomaryov ru
 Pavel Sergeevich Ponomaryov ru
 Pyotr Ponomaryov ru
 Sergey Alekseevich Ponomaryov ru
 Sergey Dmitrievich Ponomaryov ru
 Aleksey Ponomarenko ru
 Arkady Ponomarenko ru
 Viktor Ponomarenko ru
 Ivan Ponomarenko ru
 Ilya Ponomarenko ru
 Leonid Ponomarenko ru
 Pavel Ponomarenko ru
 Andrey Ponomarchuk ru
 Lavrenty Ponomarchuk ru
 Steoan Ponomarchuk ru
 Aleksandr Popkov ru
 Boris Popkov ru
 Valery Popkov ru
 Vasily Popkov ru
 Vitaly Popkov (twice)
 Fyodor Popkov ru
 Stanislav Poplavsky
 Aleksandr Vasilyevich Popov ru
 Aleksandr Grigorievich Popov ru
 Aleksandr Sergeevich Popov ru
 Aleksandr Fyodorovich Popov ru
 Aleksey Popov ru
 Anatoly Arkhipovich Popov ru
 Anatoly Fyodorovich Popov ru
 Andrey Andreevich Popov ru
 Andrey Ivanovich Popov ru
 Andrey Kirillovich Popov ru
 Andrey Fyodorovich Popov ru
 Boris Popov ru
 Vasily Andreevich Popov ru
 Vasily Ivanovich Popov ru
 Vasily Lazarevich Popov ru
 Vasily Stepanovich Popov
 Gennady Popov ru
 Georgy Vasilyevich Popov ru
 Georgy Yevdokimovich Popov ru
 Georgy Timofeevich Popov ru
 Dmitry Popov ru
 Ivan Anisimovich Popov ru
 Ivan Mikhailovich Popov ru
 Ivan Petrovich Popov ru
 Ivan Stepanovich Popov ru
 Konstantin Popov ru
 Leonid Ivanovich Popov (twice)
 Leonid Ilyich Popov ru
 Markian Popov
 Mikhail Nikolaevich Popov ru
 Mikhail Romanovich Popov ru
 Nikolai Antonovich Popov ru
 Nikolai Zakharovich Popov ru
 Nikolai Ivanovich Popov ru
 Nikolai Ilyich Popov ru
 Nikolai Isaakovich Popov ru
 Nikolai Mikhailovich Popov ru
 Nikolai Fyodorovich Popov ru
 Pavel Popov  ru
 Pyotr Georgievich Popov ru
 Pyotr Dmitrievich Popov ru
 Semyon Popov ru
 Stepan Popov ru
 Fyodor Grigorievich Popov ru
 Fyodor Kuzmich Popov ru
 Nadezhda Popova
 Vladimir Popovich ru
 Grigory Popovich ru
 Pavel Popovich (twice)
 Pavel Popravka ru
 Aleksandr Popryadukhin ru
 Aleksey Popugaev ru
 Nikolai Popudrenko ru
 Ivan Porechenkov ru
 Vladimir Porik ru
 Pavel Porosenkov ru
 Zinaida Portnova
 Sergey Portnyagin ru
 Andrey Portyanko ru
 Ivan Posadsky ru
 Pavel Posvit ru
 Aleksandr Poskonkin ru
 Ivan Poskryobyshev ru
 Nikolai Posokhin ru
 Grigory Posokhov ru
 Pavel Pospelov ru
 Sergey Postevoy ru
 Aleksey Postnov ru
 Aleksey Postny ru
 Nikolai Potapenko ru
 Filipp Potapenko ru
 Aleksandr Zakharovich Potapov ru
 Aleksandr Semyonovich Potapov ru
 Vasily Potapov ru
 Dmitry Kapitonovich Potapov ru
 Dmitry Mefodevich Potapov ru
 Dmitry Sergeevich Potapov ru
 Mikhail Potapov
 Pyotr Potapov ru
 Sergey Potapov ru
 Eduard Potapov ru
 Nikolai Poteev ru
 Aleksey Potyomkin ru
 Gennady Potyomkin ru
 Mikhail Potyomkin ru
 Ivan Potekhin ru
 Andrey Potopolsky ru
 Pyotr Potryasov ru
 Nikolai Potuzhny ru
 Dmitry Potylitsyn ru
 Vasily Pokhvalin ru
 Ivan Pokhlebaev ru
 Ivan Potseluev ru
 Nikolai Pochivalin ru
 Nikolai Pochtaryov ru
 Timofey Pochtaryov ru
 Pyotr Pochukalin ru
 Stepan Poshivalnikov ru
 Yakov Poshtarenko ru
 Aleksey Poyushchev ru
 Vladimir Poyarkov ru
 Vladimir Pravik
 Mikhail Prasolov ru
 Georgy Preobrazhensky ru
 Yevgeny Preobrazhensky ru
 Aleksandr Presnyakov ru
 Ivan Presnyakov ru
 Nikolai Pribylov ru
 Dmitry Privalov ru
 Ivan Privalov ru
 Aleksandr Prigara ru
 Aleksey Priglebov ru
 Aleksey Prikazchikov ru
 Pyotr Prilepa ru
 Nikolai Primak ru
 Pavel Primak ru
 Ivan Primakin ru
 Pavel Primakov ru
 Vasily Priputnev ru
 Timofey Prisekin ru
 Nikolai Prisyagin ru
 Vasily Prikhodtsev ru
 Vasily Prikhodko ru
 Gennady Prikhodk ru
 Ivan Prikhodk ru
 Nazar Prikhodk ru
 Nikolai Prikhodk ru
 Pyotr Prikhodk ru
 Sergey Prikhodk ru
 Konstantin Provalov
 Grigory Provanov ru
 Vasily Prokatov ru
 Anatoly Prokashev ru
 Vladimir Prokopenko ru
 Georgy Prokopenko ru
 Grigory Prokopenko ru
 Anatolu Prokopchik ru
 Nikolai Prokopyuk ru
 Viktor Prokofev ru
 Vladimir Prokofev ru
 Gavriil Prokofev ru
 Timofey Prokofiev 
 Fyodor Prokofev ru
 Aleksey Prokudin ru
 Vasily Pronin ru
 Ivan Pronin ru
 Konstantin Pronin ru
 Mikhail Pronin
 Ivan Prosandeev ru
 Pyotr Prosvetov ru
 Mikhail Prosvirnin ru
 Mikhail Prosvirnov ru
 Yakov Proskyrin ru
 Ivan Proskurov
 Ivan Proskuryakov ru
 Ivan Prosolov ru
 Yemelyan Prosyanik ru
 Ivan Prosyanoy ru
 Vasily Protasyuk ru
 Ivan Protvin ru
 Valentin Protopopov ru
 Ivan Protopopov ru
 Viktor Protchev ru
 Nikolai Prokhorenko ru
 Aleksandr Aleksandrovich Prokhorov ru
 Aleksandr Vasilyevich Prokhorov ru
 Aleksey Prokhorov (twice)
 Vasily Ivanovich Prokhorov ru
 Vasily Nikitovich Prokhorov ru
 Yevgeny Prokhorov ru
 Zinon Prokhorov ru
 Ivan Prokhorov ru
 Mikhail Prokhorov ru
 Nikolai Prokhorov ru
 Leonid Protsenko ru
 Stepan Protsenko ru
 Nikolai Proshenkov ru
 Ivan Proshin ru
 Aleksey Proshlyakov ru
 Grigory Proshchaev ru
 Nikolai Prudky ru
 Dmitry Prudnikov ru
 Mikhail Prudnikov ru
 Fyodor Prudchenko ru
 Dumitru Prunariu
 Grigory Prutko ru
 Stepan Prutkov ru
 Vladimir Prygov ru
 Aleksandr Prygunov ru
 Daniil Prytkov ru
 Aleksandr Pryashennikov ru
 Nikolai Pryanichnikov ru
 Ivan Pryakhin ru
 Ivan Pstygo ru
 Andrey Ptitsyn ru
 Aleksandr Ptukhin ru
 Yevgeny Ptukhin
 Roland de la Poype
 Stepan Pugaev ru
 Maksim Pugach ru
 Anatoly Pugachyov ru
 Arseny Pugachyov ru
 Viktor Pugachyov
 Terenty Pygachyov ru
 Fyodor Pugachyov ru
 Pavel Pudovkin ru
 Ivan Puzanov ru
 Lev Puzanov ru
 Anatoly Puzikov ru
 Sergey Puzyryov ru
 Fyodor Puzyryov ru
 Yakov Puzyrkin ru
 Gely Pukito ru
 Trofim Pukov ru
 Grigory Pulov
 Grigory Pulkin ru
 Vasily Pulny ru
 Konstantin Pulyaevsky ru
 Pyotr Pumpur
 Vasily Pundikov ru
 Mikhail Pupkov ru
 Kuzma Purgin ru
 Nikolai Purgin ru
 Pavel Purin ru
 Fyodor Purtov ru
 Semyon Pustelnikov ru
 Aleksey Pustovalov ru
 Nikolai Pustyntsev ru
 Endel Puusepp
 Vasily Putilin ru
 Mikhail Putilin ru
 Sidor Putilov ru
 Aleksandr Putin ru
 Ivan Putintsev ru
 Nikolai Putko ru
 Nikolai Pukha ru
 Ivan Pukhov ru
 Nikolai Pukhov
 German Puchkov ru
 Mikhail Puchkov ru
 Ivan Pushanin ru
 Aleksey Pushanka ru
 Fedora Pushina
 Konstantin Pushkaryov ru
 Sergey Pushkaryov ru
 Anatoly Pushkarenko ru
 Anatoly Pushkin ru
 Yefim Pushkin ru
 Nikolai Pushkin ru
 Mikhail Pushchin ru
 Vladimir Pchelintsev
 Aleksandr Pchyolkin ru
 Gennady Pshenitsin ru
 Aleksey Pshenichko ru
 Nikolai Pshenichnikov ru
 Andrey Pshenichnykh ru
 Sergey Pshyonny ru
 Yevgeny Pylaev ru
 Konstantin Pylaev ru
 Yuri Pyrkov ru
 Vasily Pyryaev ru
 Nikolai Pysin ru
 Aleksey Pytkin ru
 Yuri Pykhin ru
 Ivan Pyanzin ru
 Aleksandr Pyankov ru
 Nikolai Pyankov ru
 Grigory Penezhko ru
 Aleksandr Pyatakovich ru
 Ivan Pyatenko ru
 Mikhail Pyatikop ru
 Georgy Pyatkin ru
 Ivan Pyatkovsky ru
 Ivan Pyatykhin ru
 Ivan Pyatyarin ru

References 

 
 Russian Ministry of Defence Database «Подвиг Народа в Великой Отечественной войне 1941—1945 гг.» [Feat of the People in the Great Patriotic War 1941-1945] (in Russian).

Lists of Heroes of the Soviet Union